Pol Gardan (also Romanized as Pol-e Gardan) is a village in Kolijan Rostaq-e Sofla Rural District, in the Central District of Sari County, Mazandaran Province, Iran. At the 2006 census, its population was 1,091, in 294 families.

References 

Populated places in Sari County